The Ghosts That Haunt Me is the 1991 debut album by the Canadian folk rock group Crash Test Dummies. It featured their hit "Superman's Song".

The artwork featured on the cover, and throughout the liner notes, is by 19th-century illustrator Gustav Doré and is from 'The Rime of the Ancient Mariner' by Samuel Taylor Coleridge. The same painting would later be used for black metal band Judas Iscariot's final album To Embrace the Corpses Bleeding in 2002.

The artworks on the booklet of the album are by 19th-century illustrator Gustav Doré and are from 'The Rime of the Ancient Mariner' by Samuel Taylor Coleridge, except "The Flying Man" by French novelist Nicolas Restif de la Bretonne, from 'The Discovery of the Austral Continent by a Flying Man', 1781.

Track listing

Personnel
Brad Roberts – lead vocals, acoustic and electric guitars
Ellen Reid – piano, keyboards, accordion, tin whistle, backing vocals
Benjamin Darvill – mandolin, harmonica
Dan Roberts – bass guitar
Vince Lambert – drums
Steve Berlin – percussion
Bob Doige – recorder on At My Funeral
Greg Leisz – pedal steel on The Voyage
Garth Reid – banjo on Comin' Back Soon
Lynn Selwood – cello on Superman's Song
Bill Zulak – violin on Winter Song, The Country Life, At My Funeral.

Reception

Allmusic writer Stephen Thomas Erlewine gave it 3½ out of 5 stars and called it "a fine debut album by the ever-smug, collegiate, folk-pop humorists."

References

External links

Crash Test Dummies albums
1991 debut albums